St. Louis, Iron Mountain and Southern Railway #5 is a 2-4-2 "Columbian" type steam locomotive. It was originally built by H.K. Porter, Inc. in 1946 as a saddle tank engine for the Central Illinois Public Service Company. In 1963, the locomotive was donated to the Mid-Continent Railway Museum in North Freedom, Wisconsin as a static display piece. In 1971, #5 was sold to the Crab Orchard and Egyptian Railway to be restored to operating condition, and #5 began pulling passenger excursions on the Crab Orchard and Egyptian's track line, as well as occasional freight runs. During this career, the locomotive was converted to a tender locomotive, and the saddle tank over the boiler was presumably scrapped. In 1985, #5 was sold again to the St. Louis, Iron Mountain and Southern Railway, who one year later began using the locomotive to run tourist trips in Missouri. This career lasted until 1999. Presently, the #5 is out of service, waiting for an overhaul to be completed.

History

Early years 
#5 was constructed by H.K. Porter, Incorporated in 1946, and it became one of the last steam engines to be built by Porter during the company's decline. Having started out as a saddle tank engine, #5 was initially used by the Central Illinois Public Service Company to switch coal cars around a rail yard in Meredosia, Illinois. In 1963, #5 was decommissioned from service, and it was among 3 steam engines that the Central Illinois Company donated to the Mid-Continent Railway Museum, with the other two being #6, which was formerly E.I. Dupont Company #4, and #7, which was formerly New York Central #6721.

Crab Orchard and Egyptian Ownership 
In 1971, #5 was acquired by the newly-established Crab Orchard and Egyptian Railway, and it was moved to their location in Marion, Illinois. It was subsequently used to pull tourist trips on former Illinois Central Railroad trackage. During the winter of 1973 and 1974, crews converted #5 from a saddle tank engine to a tender engine; they removed the saddle tank from the boiler, and they purchased Illinois Central auxiliary water tender X5512, which was formerly numbered A-512, to be converted to a conventional steam engine tender with a coal bunker, and it became paired with #5. On October 18, 1977, #5 pulled the CO&E's first revenue freight train, and with the subsequent profit of revenue freight runs and the declining success of tourist trips, the CO&E discontinued all of its passenger trains in 1979. #5 was removed from service on the railroad that same year.

Time in Missouri 
In 1985, Shelby Brown approached the CO&E and offered to purchase #5 for the Southeast Missouri Steam Locomotive Association. The offer was accepted, and #5 was moved over the Union Pacific Railroad mainline to Jackson, Missouri, where a tourist railroad was being developed to operate over former Missouri Pacific Railroad trackage. The engine returned to service in 1986, and it began pulling passenger trips on the new tourist railroad, now dubbed the St. Louis, Iron Mountain and Southern Railway, between Jackson, Gordonville, Dutchtown, and Delta.

In the mid-late 1990's though, the FRA enforced new rules and regulations in steam locomotive operation and maintenance, and several steam engines that were operational at the time had to be inspected. After performing one last run in 1999, #5 underwent an FRA inspection, but it failed the inspection after damaged flues were discovered. The engine had to undergo a complete overhaul, which would include a lot of the parts being required to be replaced with newer identical ones, in order to run again, but it was estimated to cost $150,000 to complete the work, and the StLIM&S didn't have that kind of money. They began a fundraising campaign to raise enough money to begin the overhaul, but the cost soon ballooned to $200,000, and a lack of funds would cause #5's overhaul to be cancelled. The engine's parts would be scattered around the Jackson, Missouri depot for the next 20 years.  

In 2019, five steam locomotive enthusiasts in Southeastern Missouri and Southern Illinois, Billy Mikoliza, Nathan Beasley, Aspen Welker, Matthew Terlunen, and Lucas Smith, began to formulate plans and applications to return #5 to operational status. Two years later, in January 2021, it was announced that the five-person team would raise funds to reassemble #5 with new components for a return to service. The team began to research historical records and evaluate expenses, and they consulted the National Museum of Transportation in St. Louis for information on the construction of engines similar to #5. They also began to formulate plans to restore the trackage that lies between Jackson and Gordonville.

Gallery

References 

Preserved steam locomotives of Missouri
2-4-2 locomotives